The Special Sensor Microwave Imager / Sounder (SSMIS) is a 24-channel, 21-frequency, linearly polarized passive microwave radiometer system.   The instrument is flown on board the United States Air Force Defense Meteorological Satellite Program (DMSP) F-16, F-17, F-18 and F-19 satellites, which were launched in October 2003, November 2006, October 2009, and April 2014, respectively.  It is the successor to the Special Sensor Microwave/Imager (SSM/I). The SSMIS on the F19 satellite stopped producing useful data in February 2016.

Instrument characteristics 

The SSMIS sensor is a passive conically scanning microwave radiometer that combines and extends the current imaging and sounding capabilities of three previously separate DMSP microwave sensors: the SSM/T-1 temperature sounder, the SSMI/T- 2 moisture sounder, and the SSM/I. The SSMIS instrument measures microwave energy at 24 discrete frequencies from 19 to 183 GHz with a swath width of 1700 km.
The first SSMIS was launched aboard the DMSP-16 satellite on 18 October 2003.
Due to a manufacturing mistake, the polarization for the channels at 50.3, 52.8, 53.6, 54.4 and 55.5 of the first unit of SSMIS (the one flying on DMSP-16) was reversed. Those five channels detect the vertical polarization rather than the Horizontal polarization detected by the successive units of SSMIS.

References 

Microwave technology
Satellite meteorology
Radiometry
Spacecraft instruments